Gladiolus pole-evansii is a species of plant in the family Iridaceae. It is endemic to the Mpumalanga province of South Africa. Its natural habitat is subtropical or tropical dry shrubland.

References

pole-evansii
Flora of the Northern Provinces
Vulnerable plants
Taxonomy articles created by Polbot